Norman Walker (15 October 1935 – 30 December 2009) was  a former Australian rules footballer who played with Richmond in the Victorian Football League (VFL).

Notes

External links 
		

1935 births
2009 deaths
Australian rules footballers from Tasmania
Richmond Football Club players